Luis Javier María Guarino Moscatelli (born April 16, 1986 in Salto), known as Javier Guarino, is an Uruguayan footballer who last played for  as a striker.

Career
Guarino started his professional career playing with Defensor Sporting in 2006.

During 2011, he played in Espoli of Ecuador scoring 10 goals in 41 matches.

In January 2012, he was transferred to Uruguayan Primera División side C.A. Bella Vista.

On 12 July 2012, Guarino signed a new deal with Caracas FC of Venezuela. He made his Venezuelan Primera División debut on 11 August 2012, scoring a goal against Estudiantes de Mérida.

References

External links

Javier Guarino at playmakerstats.com (English version of ceroacero.es)

1986 births
Living people
Uruguayan footballers
Association football forwards
Uruguayan expatriate footballers
Defensor Sporting players
Plaza Colonia players
Rocha F.C. players
PEC Zwolle players
PFC Lokomotiv Plovdiv players
C.D. ESPOLI footballers
C.A. Bella Vista players
Real Esppor Club players
Caracas FC players
Tacuarembó F.C. players
Xelajú MC players
L.D.U. Portoviejo footballers
Deportes Copiapó footballers
Cobreloa footballers
Puerto Montt footballers
Footballers from Salto, Uruguay
Uruguayan Primera División players
Uruguayan Segunda División players
Eerste Divisie players
First Professional Football League (Bulgaria) players
Ecuadorian Serie A players
Venezuelan Primera División players
Liga Nacional de Fútbol de Guatemala players
Ecuadorian Serie B players
Primera B de Chile players
Expatriate footballers in the Netherlands
Expatriate footballers in Bulgaria
Expatriate footballers in Ecuador
Expatriate footballers in Venezuela
Expatriate footballers in Guatemala
Expatriate footballers in Chile
Uruguayan expatriate sportspeople in the Netherlands
Uruguayan expatriate sportspeople in Bulgaria
Uruguayan expatriate sportspeople in Ecuador
Uruguayan expatriate sportspeople in Venezuela
Uruguayan expatriate sportspeople in Guatemala
Uruguayan expatriate sportspeople in Chile
Association football midfielders